Dr. Doyin Abiola, Doyinsola Hamidat Abiola  (Nee Aboaba) was the Managing Director and Publisher of National Concord Newspaper She is the first Nigerian woman to be an editor of a Nigerian daily newspaper.

Education and career 
Dr. Doyin Abiola was educated at the University of Ibadan, Nigeria where she earned a degree in English and Drama in 1969. After graduation, she started work with the Daily Sketch Newspaper in 1969. During this period, she started writing a column in the newspaper called Tiro which was addressing sundry issues of public concern, including gender matters. In 1970, she left Daily Sketch Newspaper and traveled to the United States to pursue a master’s degree programme in Journalism. upon her return, she was employed as a Features Writer at Daily Times and rose to become the Group Features Editor. She later went to New York University and obtained a PhD in communications and political science in 1979.
 After her PHD programme, she returned to the Daily Times and was deployed to the Editorial Board where she worked with other experienced editors like Stanley Macebuh, Dele Giwa and Amma Ogan. It was, however, to be a short stay as the newly formed National Concord Newspaper invited her to be its pioneer daily editor. She then moved to be an editor of National Concord newspaper. She was promoted to be the Managing Director/editor-in-chief in 1986. She became the first Nigerian woman to become the editor in chief of a daily newspaper in Nigeria. Dr. Doyin Abiola is also the widow of the first publisher and proprietor of National Concord Newspaper Chief Moshood Abiola whom she married in 1981. Doyin Abiola’s career at National Concord Newspaper spanned three decades. She also served in various capacities in the media industry in Nigeria. She was the Chairperson of the Awards Nominating panel at the first Nigerian Media Merit Award to be hosted in Nigeria. She was a member of Advisory Council, Faculty of Social and Management Sciences, Ogun State University.

Awards and recognition 
She was a recipient of Diamond Awards for Media Excellence (DAME) for her lifelong devotion to advancing the frontiers of knowledge and strengthening the media as a pillar of democracy. The Trustees of DAME unanimously approved her selection as a recipient of its Lifetime Achievement Award at the 24th DAME Ceremony. She was the second woman to receive a DAME Lifetime Achievement Award after Mrs.(Omobola Onajide).
 She was granted Eisenhower Fellowship in 1986.

See also 
 Moshood Abiola

References 

Year of birth missing (living people)
Living people
Nigerian media personalities
Place of birth missing (living people)
Yoruba journalists
Yoruba women in business
Abiola family
Nigerian journalists
Nigerian women journalists
Nigerian editors
Nigerian corporate directors
University of Ibadan alumni
Olabisi Onabanjo University people
New York University alumni
Nigerian women business executives
Nigerian newspaper publishers (people)
20th-century births
Women corporate directors